Samuel Nlend (born 15 March 1995) is a footballer who plays as a forward for Saudi Arabian club Bisha. Born in Cameroon, he has represented both Cameroon and the Central African Republic internationally.

Club career
In August 2016, Nlend signed for Al Ittihad Alexandria Club but was released four days later after testing positive for HIV/AIDS.

On 1 January 2023, Nlend joined Saudi Arabian club Bisha.

International career
Nlend represented the Cameroon national team in 5 friendlies in 2016. In 2022, he switched to represent the Central African Republic national team, having gained citizenship.

International goals
Scores and results list Cameroon's goal tally first.

References

External links

1995 births
Living people
Footballers from Douala
Citizens of the Central African Republic through descent
Cameroonian footballers
Central African Republic footballers
Association football forwards
Union Douala players
Futuro Kings FC players
Bisha FC players
Elite One players
Saudi Second Division players
Cameroon international footballers
Central African Republic international footballers
Dual internationalists (football)
Cameroonian expatriate footballers
Central African Republic expatriate footballers
Cameroonian expatriate sportspeople in Equatorial Guinea
Central African Republic expatriate sportspeople in Equatorial Guinea
Expatriate footballers in Equatorial Guinea
Central African Republic expatriate sportspeople in Saudi Arabia
Expatriate footballers in Saudi Arabia
Cameroonian people of Central African Republic descent
People with HIV/AIDS
Cameroon A' international footballers
2016 African Nations Championship players